Robert Cameron (1920-2012) was a Canadian diplomat. While working with the Canadian Department of External Affairs he served as the Director-General of International Security Affairs, and as a representative of the department on the Canada-U.S. Permanent Joint Board on Defence. Cameron served as the ambassador to Yugoslavia between 1974-1977, and Poland between 1978-1980.

References 

1920 births
2012 deaths
Ambassadors of Canada to Poland
Ambassadors of Canada to Yugoslavia
People from Montreal